Steve James Sherlock (born 1953) is a British composer, musician, saxophone player who was a founder member of Neu Electrikk, joined Matt Johnson in the Post punk band The The and notably Marc Almond in Marc and the Mambas.

Career summary
Sherlock grew up in Thornton Heath, UK, and played the saxophone, clarinet and Flute. On hearing musicians like Andy Mackay of the 1970s band Roxy Music and Davey Payne, Ian Dury and The Blockheads Sherlock developed his own method of playing. This invariably involved experimenting with sound and processing the playing through various effects pedals.
He met the vocalist Derek Morris in 1977 and together they formed Electra Vogue. Steve Parry later joined Sherlock and Morris having answered an advert placed by Morris in the NME for experimental musicians into The Velvet Underground, David Bowie. This trio of musicians formed the nucleus of what was later to become Neu Electrikk

Neu Electrikk

Neu Electrikk comprised singer songwriter Derek Morris, guitarist and electronics Steve Parry, bass player Nicholas Chamberlain Hunt, sax/flute/treatments Steve Sherlock and Barry Deller on drums/percussion. Neu Electrikk were based in London and part of the experimental, post punk music scene that included artists like This Heat, The The, Wire and Throbbing Gristle. Live concerts were erratic events, whereby three-minute songs became long passages of improvisation and noise. Neu Electrikk would often take to the stage to the voice of Frank Sinatra being accompanied by pre-recorded tapes of bird song and the sound of an industrial hammer.

The The

Sherlock became involved with Matt Johnson having been introduced by Steve Parry. Keith Laws had quit the The and they comprised Matt Johnson with Simon Turner (guitar/vocals), Colin Lloyd Tucker (guitar/vocals) and Steve Sherlock (saxophone). In 1982 he contributed Flute and Saxophone to 'Three Orange Kisses From Kazan' and 'Waitin' For The Upturn', compositions for the intended debut album by the The (The Pornography of Despair), but this album was never officially released. Both compositions later appeared on the b-side to the 12" version of 'Uncertain Smile' and were included on the cassette version of Soul Mining. Sherlock played Flute and Saxophone on the demo recording of 'Uncertain Smile'. Matt had defined most of the crisp melody lines on his original demo with Sherlock having contributed the Sax and Flute lines. However, Johnson later recorded a version of the composition in New York City with sax and flute session player Crispin Cioe. Sherlock played with the The at their month-long Marquee Club residency in London.

Marc Almond

Matt Johnson recommended Sherlock to Marc Almond.
Marc and the Mambas was a new wave group, formed by Marc Almond, in 1982 as an offshoot project from Soft Cell. Notably the only consistent members of Marc and the Mambas were Marc Almond, Anne Hogan and Steve James Sherlock. Almond and Sherlock, together with Annie Hogan recorded as Marc and the Mambas.
His inventive playing featured prominently on 'Torment and Toreros'. Sherlock notably sharing writing credits with Almond for the track Narcissus for the album. Marc and the Mambas could be considered the blueprint for Marc Almond's solo career. Torment and Toreros being an eclectic blend of Vaudeville, French chanson, goth sensibility, guitar noise, saxophones/flutes, piano and string sections. Marc Almond became mentally ill during the course of making the album and he later noted ironically that the Torment and Toreros album was a nervous breakdown put to music.'Torment and Toreros' reached No. 28 in the UK album charts in August 1983. Shortly after completing the album Almond disbanded the band. Antony Hegarty of Antony and the Johnsons has referred to Marc and the Mambas being his favourite band all through his teens, becoming the starting point for Antony and the Johnsons and the album 'Torment and Toreros' being probably the definitive record of his adolescence.
2012 – Steve James Sherlock featured on Marc and the Mambas limited edition CD/DVD set Three Black Nights of Little Black Bites – Live at the Duke of York's Theatre, 1983. The concert DVD was filmed by Peter "Sleazy" Christopherson from the industrial, avant-garde visual art group Throbbing Gristle.

Other recordings
Sherlock worked on various sessions with Keith Laws The The (unreleased). Recorded with Matt Johnson/Colin Lloyd Tucker/ Simon Fisher Turner contributing to the Deux Filles – 'Silence and Wisdom' LP. Sherlock contributed flute to the track 'The Hungry Years by Marc Almond and Andi Sexgang included on the 1983 compilation album 'The Whip'. Sherlock recorded with Red Army Choir for their EP Schizophrenic – released 1981 on Red Rhino Records.

Selected discography
 Cover Girl – Neu Electrikk (1979)
 Lust of Berlin – Neu Electrikk (1978)
 Soul Mining (cassette and later extra tracks CD version) – The The (1983)
 Torment and Toreros – Marc and the Mambas (1983)
 Uncertain Smile – (12" Single b-side) – The The (1982)
 Silence and Wisdom – Deux Filles (1982)
 Red1B3 – Red Army Choir (1982)
 Three Black Nights of Little Black Bites – Marc and the Mambas (1983)
 Silence & Wisdom & Double Happiness – Deux Filles (1982,1983,2013) Double CD Package LTM Records

References

External links
Discogs 
Allmusic 
Marc and the Mambas 
The 
Neu Electrikk 

English rock saxophonists
British male saxophonists
Living people
1953 births
People from Thornton Heath
Musicians from London
Marc and the Mambas members
21st-century saxophonists
21st-century British male musicians